Alberto Breccia (April 15, 1919 – November 10, 1993) was an Uruguayan-born Argentine artist and cartoonist. A gifted penciller and inker, Breccia is one of the most celebrated and famous comics/Historieta creators in the world, and specially prominent in Latin America and Europe. His son Enrique Breccia and daughter Patricia Breccia are also comic book artists.

Renowned comic book author Frank Miller considers Breccia as one of his personal mentors, even declaring that (regarding modernity in comics): "it all started with Breccia".

Biography
Born in Montevideo, Uruguay, Breccia moved with his parents to Buenos Aires, Argentina when he was three years old. After leaving school, Breccia worked in a tripe packing plant and in 1938 he got a job for the magazine El Resero, where he wrote articles and drew the covers.

He began to work professionally in 1939, when he joined the publishing house Manuel Láinez. He worked on magazines such as Tit-Bits, Rataplán and El Gorrión where he created comic strips such as Mariquita Terremoto, Kid Río Grande, El Vengador (based on a popular novel), and other adaptations.

During the 1950s he became an "honorary" member of the "Group of Venice" that consisted of expatriate Italian artists such as Hugo Pratt, Ido Pavone, Horacio Lalia, Faustinelli and Ongaro. Other honorary members were Francisco Solano López, Carlo Cruz and Arturo Perez del Castillo. With Hugo Pratt, he started the Pan-American School of Art in Buenos Aires. In 1957  he joined publisher Editorial Frontera, under the direction of Héctor Germán Oesterheld, where he created several Ernie Pike stories. In 1958  Breccia's series Sherlock Time ran in the comic magazine Hora Cero Extra, with scripts by Oesterheld.

In 1960  he began to work for European publishers via a Buenos Aires-based art agency: for British publishing house Fleetway he drew a few westerns and war stories. This period did not last long. His son Enrique Breccia would also draw a few war stories for Fleetway in the late 1960s, such as Spy 13.

Breccia and Oesterheld collaborated to produce one of the most important comic strips in history, Mort Cinder, in 1962.  The face of the immortal Cinder is modeled after Breccia's assistant, Horacio Lalia, and the appearance of his companion, the antique dealer Ezra Winston, is actually Breccia's own. Cinder and Winston's strip began on July 26, 1962, in issue Nº 714 of Misterix magazine, and ran until 1964 .

In 1968  Breccia was joined by his son, Enrique, in a project to draw the comic biography of Che, the life of Che Guevara, again with a script provided by Oesterheld. This comic book is considered the chief cause behind Oesterheld's disappearance.

In 1969  Oesterheld rewrote the script of El Eternauta, for the Argentinian magazine Gente. Breccia drew the story with a decidedly experimental style, resorting to diverse techniques.  The resulting work was anything but conventional and moving away from the commercial. Breccia refused to modify its style, which added to the tone of the script, and was much different from Francisco Solano López original.

During the seventies, Breccia makes major graphic innovations in black and white and color with series like Un tal Daneri and Chi ha paura delle fiabe?, written by Carlos Trillo. On the last one, a satire based on Brothers Grimm's tales, he plays with texture, mixing collage, acrylic and watercolor. This technique will be used later in the eighties by Anglo-Saxons authors such as Bill Sienkiewicz and Dave McKean.

Other stories include: Cthulhu Mythos, Buscavidas (text by Carlos Trillo), a Historia grafica del Chile and Perramus, inspired by the work of the poet Juan Sasturain a pamphlet against the dictatorship in Argentina.

Breccia died in Buenos Aires in 1993.

Partial bibliography

Mariquita Terremoto.
Kid Río Grande.
El Vengador.
Jean de Martinica.
Vito Nervio (1947–1959 and 1974), with stories by Leonardo Wadel
Mision Thyuraine (1961), with stories by Leonardo Wadel
Pancho López (1956)
Ernie Pike, written by Oesterheld
Sherlock Time (1958–1959), written by Oesterheld
Mort Cinder (1962–1964), written by Oesterheld
Richard Long (1966), written by Oesterheld
Vida del Che (1968), written by Oesterheld, additional art by Enrique Breccia
El Eternauta (1969 edition), written by Oesterheld
Evita, vida y obra de Eva Perón (1970), written by Oesterheld
Squadra Zenith (1972–1974)
Los Mitos de Cthulhu (1973), written by Norberto Buscaglia, from text by H. P. Lovecraft
Un Tal Daneri (1974–1978), written by Trillo
El Corazón Delator (1975), from a text by Edgar Allan Poe
 El Aire (1976), written by Guillermo Saccomanno
Nadie (1977), written by Trillo.
Buscavidas (1981), written by Trillo
Perramus (1983), written by Juan Sasturain
Drácula, Dracul, Vlad?, Bah... (1984)
Informe Sobre Ciegos (1991), from text by Ernesto Sábato
El Dorado, El Delirio de Lope de Aguirre (1992), written by Carlos Albiac
Martín Fierro, by José Hernández
Platos Voladores Al Ataque!!, written by Oesterheld

References

External links

 Muestras de Breccia y Barnes se llevan a cabo en la Ciudad de Buenos Aires on Ouroboros world (Spanish)
 Alberto Breccia biography on Lambiek Comiclopedia
 Alberto Breccia biography on Dan Dare
 La Historieta Argentina Alberto Breccia work
 Alberto Breccia interview on Tebeosfera 
 Alberto Breccia dossier FFF 

Uruguayan comics artists
Argentine comics artists
1919 births
1993 deaths
Uruguayan people of Italian descent
Uruguayan emigrants to Argentina